D'or Anthony Naheem Fischer (born October 12, 1981) is an American-Israeli professional basketball player for Elitzur Eito Ashkelon of the Israeli National League. He has also represented the senior Israeli national team.

College career 
Fischer was born in Philadelphia, Pennsylvania, and did not play basketball for the school when he attended Upper Darby High School.

Fischer played college basketball at Northwestern State University and also at West Virginia University with the West Virginia Mountaineers. As a sophomore, he was honorable mention all-Southland Conference selection after averaging 9.8 points, 7.2 rebounds, and 4.4 blocks per game, and totalling 133 blocks for the season (second in the nation). He broke the NSU record for blocks in a game (with 13) and was just one short of the NCAA record of 14 shared by four players.

Professional career 
After going undrafted at the 2005 NBA draft, Fischer signed his first professional contract with the Polish club Anwil Włocławek. However, he left Anwil after only three games. In January 2006, he signed with the Roanoke Dazzle of the NBA D-League.

For the 2006–07 season, he signed with EWE Baskets Oldenburg of the German Bundesliga. The following season, he played in Belgium with Euphony Bree.

On July 17, 2008, he signed a one-year contract with the Israeli club Maccabi Tel Aviv. On August 2, 2009, he re-signed with Maccabi for one more season.

On July 24, 2010, he signed a one-year contract with the Spanish club Real Madrid. On August 1, 2011, he moved to another Spanish club, Bilbao Basket, for the 2010–11 season.

On August 25, 2012, he signed with the Ukrainian club Donetsk.

On September 27, 2013, he signed with the NBA's Washington Wizards. However, he was later waived by the Wizards on October 16.

On November 24, 2013, he signed a one-year contract with the German club Brose Baskets. In April 2014, he was named to the German League's All-Basketball Bundesliga First Team.

On August 2, 2014, he signed a one-year deal with Russian club UNICS Kazan. In the 2014–15 EuroLeague season, he averaged 13.1 points per game, with a 75 percent field goal percentage from the field, and averaged 5.7 rebounds per game.

On July 15, 2015, Fischer signed a one-year contract with the Israeli club Hapoel Jerusalem. On March 25, 2016, he parted ways with Hapoel, after averaging 8.7 points and 5 rebounds per game in the Israeli League.

On January 8, 2017, Fischer signed with the Capitanes de Arecibo of Puerto Rico. He left Arecibo, after appearing in three games, and on March 14, 2017, he signed with Latvian club Valmiera, for the rest of the season.

On August 8, 2017, Fischer signed with the Shiga Lakestars, of the Japanese B.League.

On February 10, 2019, Fischer returned to Israel for a third stint, joining Bnei Herzliya for the rest of the season.

On December 11, 2019, Fischer signed with Elitzur Eito Ashkelon of the Israeli National League for the rest of the season.

Israeli national team 
Fischer has been a member of the senior Israeli national basketball team. He played with Israel at the 2015 EuroBasket.

Career statistics

Domestic leagues

Personal 
On March 1, 2009, Fischer was attacked outside of a club in Tel Aviv with a glass bottle. He was injured in the face and his facial nerves were damaged, but he has fully healed.

In July 2014, after marrying an Israeli woman, Fischer became an Israeli citizen and joined the Israel national basketball team.

See also 
 List of NCAA Division I men's basketball players with 13 or more blocks in a game

References

External links 
 D'or Fischer at eurobasket.com
 D'or Fischer at euroleague.net
 D'or Fischer at fiba.com
 D'or Fischer  at msnsportsnet.com

1981 births
Living people
American expatriate basketball people in Belgium
American expatriate basketball people in Germany
American expatriate basketball people in Japan
American expatriate basketball people in Latvia
American expatriate basketball people in Russia
American expatriate basketball people in Spain
American expatriate basketball people in Ukraine
American men's basketball players
Basketball players from Philadelphia
BC Donetsk players
BC UNICS players
Bilbao Basket players
BK Valmiera players
Bnei Hertzeliya basketball players
Bree BBC players
Brose Bamberg players
Capitanes de Arecibo players
Centers (basketball)
Elitzur Eito Ashkelon players
EWE Baskets Oldenburg players
Hapoel Jerusalem B.C. players
Israeli American
Israeli Basketball Premier League players
Israeli men's basketball players
KK Włocławek players
Liga ACB players
Maccabi Tel Aviv B.C. players
Northwestern State Demons basketball players
Power forwards (basketball)
Real Madrid Baloncesto players
Roanoke Dazzle players
Shiga Lakes players
West Virginia Mountaineers men's basketball players